Ice-T's Rap School is a reality television show on VH1. It is a spin-off of the British reality show Gene Simmons' Rock School, which also aired on VH1.

In Rap School, rapper/actor Ice-T teaches eight teens from York Preparatory School in New York City how to become a real hip-hop group called the "York Prep Crew" ("Y.P. Crew" for short). Each week, Ice-T gives them assignments and they compete for an imitation gold chain with a microphone on it. On the season finale, the group performed as an opening act for Public Enemy.

Cast and characters
(nicknames were given by Ice-T himself)

Episodes

The Gold Mic

Guest stars

References

External links
 
 
 Ice-T's Rap School on The Futon Critic.com

2006 American television series debuts
2006 American television series endings
2000s American reality television series
VH1 original programming
Television series by Banijay
African-American reality television series
English-language television shows